"Feel Like a Rock Star" is a song written by Chris Tompkins and Rodney Clawson and recorded by American country music artists Kenny Chesney and Tim McGraw. It was released in April 2012 as the first single from Chesney's 2012 album Welcome to the Fishbowl. It is also Chesney’s last single to be released by BNA Records, a label he had been with since 1995.

History
Chesney recorded the song as a duet with McGraw and premiered it at the Academy of Country Music Awards show, broadcast on April 1, 2012. The two toured together in mid-2012.

Music video
The music video for the song depicting Chesney and McGraw performing at an airport.
Rodney Clawson and Chris Tompkins wrote the song. Clawson told Taste of Country that Tompkins had begun the song with a bass guitar line, when the two observed that "everybody wants to feel like a rock star."

Critical reception
Rating it four-and-a-half stars out of five, Billy Dukes of Taste of Country favorably compared it to "Young" and "Big Star".

Chart performance
The song debuted at number 13 on the Hot Country Songs chart for the week of April 21, 2012. It is Chesney's highest-debuting single, the previous record-holder being "Don't Blink", which debuted at number 16. It is also the second highest-debuting single since January 1990, when the charts were first tabulated electronically by Nielsen SoundScan, and the highest-debuting duet on that chart in that same timespan. Despite this high debut, the song peaked at number 11 on the Hot Country Songs chart for the week of May 26, 2012, becoming Chesney's first single to miss the top ten since "The Tin Man" peaked at number 19 in 2001. On the following week, "Feel Like a Rock Star" fell to number 18 while the follow-up single "Come Over" debuted at number 24.

This high debut was achieved mainly by the song receiving 979 plays by radio stations on Billboards survey in the day after the broadcast, most of which came from hourly airplay on stations owned by Clear Channel Communications.

Year-end charts

Certifications

Parodies
 American parody musician Cledus T. Judd released a parody of "Feel Like a Rock Star" titled "Feel Like a Pawn Star" on his 2012 album Parodyziac!!.

References

Songs about musicians
2012 singles
2012 songs
Kenny Chesney songs
Tim McGraw songs
Song recordings produced by Buddy Cannon
Songs written by Chris Tompkins
Songs written by Rodney Clawson
Music videos directed by Shaun Silva
Male vocal duets
BNA Records singles